Novokamenka is a rural locality (a selo) and the administrative center of Novokamensky Selsoviet of Yeltsovsky District, Altai Krai, Russia. The population was 379 as of 2016. There are 10 streets.

Geography 
Novokamenka is located on the bank of the Kaltyk River, 16 km north of Yeltsovka (the district's administrative centre) by road. Yeltsovka is the nearest rural locality.

References 

Rural localities in Yeltsovsky District